Villers-sur-Authie is a commune in the Somme department in Hauts-de-France in northern France.

Geography
The commune is situated 28 km (17 miles) north of Abbeville, on the D85 road.

Population

Gallery

See also
Communes of the Somme department

References

Communes of Somme (department)